The Social and Environmental Responsibility World Forum is an initiative organized by the Réseau Alliances in 1993 in partnership with private and public organizations, to encourage social and economic responsibility among businesses.

The initiative was planned for four years (2007–2010), with the goal of creating a permanent cycle of continuous exchanges and communication between actors from all parts of the world.

The work of the Forum was based on concrete projects and actions to formulate to generalize social and environmental responsibility throughout the world. During that period, major events were supposed to take place in Lille to bring together actors and experts in social and environmental responsibility of all nationalities, especially during the international meetings scheduled in October each year.

Developed on economic leaders’ initiative, the Réseau Alliances federates and helps businesses anxious to improve their performance while being more respectful of people and the environment.

Topics discussed
 A socially and environmentally responsible economy opened to the diversity of cultures and origins
 Diversity and equal opportunity
 The place and role of the world's women at all levels of responsibility
 Equal opportunities and territories: the conditions for fairer economic development
 Identifying, evaluating, and developing good practices in the company
 What it is about social and environmental responsibility

References

External links
Site officiel de l'association Alliances 
Site officiel du Forum Mondial de l'Economie Responsable
Site de référence sur la RSE et l' ISR en France 

Environmental ethics
Environmental organizations based in France
Social responsibility organizations
Organizations based in Hauts-de-France